Paraptochus is a genus of broad-nosed weevils in the beetle family Curculionidae. There are at least four described species in Paraptochus.

Species
These four species belong to the genus Paraptochus:
 Paraptochus sellatus (Boheman, 1859) i c g
 Paraptochus setiferus Van Dyke, 1935 i c g b
 Paraptochus uniformis Van Dyke, 1935 i g
 Paraptochus variegatus (Casey, 1888) c g b
Data sources: i = ITIS, c = Catalogue of Life, g = GBIF, b = Bugguide.net

References

Further reading

 
 
 
 

Entiminae
Articles created by Qbugbot